Quarai is a Brazilian municipality located near the border with Uruguay on the Rio Quaraí. The population is 22,607 (2020 est.) in an area of 3,147.63 km2, making it one of the largest municipalities in the state. Its elevation is 112 m. It is located 590 km west of the state capital of Porto Alegre, northeast of Montevideo, Uruguay and southeast of Alegrete.

Neighbouring municipalities

Uruguaiana, north
Rosário do Sul, east
Santana do Livramento, south
Artigas, Uruguay, south
Alegrete, northwest

Flag

Created in 1971, the flag is made up of three stripes, blue, green and white in normal tones, it features a blue and red triangle-rectangle and a quadrilateral green that ascends between the two triangles with a blue triangle and in the left side of the flag, the angle of the green triangle is low and right.  The center is elliptically vertical, in the white panel, the coat of arms added under law 400 December 21, 1964.

Geography

The area includes the Cerro do Jarau, a crater with 5.5 km in diameter dating back to around 117 million years and Salamanda do Jarau.

Population

History

The first inhabitants were South American Indians including the Jarros, Guenoas, Minuanos and the Charruas people.  The city was created on 8 April 1875.

The creation

The diplomatic action of the Treaty of Badajoz was signed in 1801 in which the then territorial boundary of Rio Grande do Sul became bounded at the Rio Quaraí.  In 1814, its first ranches were founded.

See also
Brazilian Island

References

External links
https://web.archive.org/web/20090728043704/http://www.citybrazil.com.br/rs/quarai/ 

Municipalities in Rio Grande do Sul
Brazil–Uruguay border crossings